John Graham Hill is an American record producer, songwriter, and musician. John Hill won a Grammy at the 62nd Annual Grammy Awards for Best Rock Album for Social Cues by Cage The Elephant. Hill has also been nominated for "Producer of the Year" for the 57th and 62nd Annual Grammy Awards. Hill currently works out of Venice, California.

Hill has written and produced for artists such as Banks, Bleachers, Carly Rae Jepsen, Charli XCX, Christina Aguilera, Christina Perri, Demi Lovato, Elle King, Eminem, Florence + the Machine, Foster The People, Imagine Dragons, Jay-Z, Kesha, Khalid, Kimbra, Kings of Leon, M.I.A., Nas, Natasha Bedingfield, P!nk, Phantogram, Portugal. The Man, Rihanna, Shakira, Tinashe, Wu-Tang Clan, and Zara Larsson.

Discography

See also 
 Sound recording and reproduction
 Music industry

References 

American record producers
American male songwriters
Living people
Year of birth missing (living people)
Place of birth missing (living people)